Zygaena rosinae is a species of moth in the Zygaenidae family. It is found in Armenia. 
Z. rosinae Korb (7f), from Armenia, resembles scovitzii but the palpi and nearly the whole abdomen, especially in the female are bright red.

References

Moths described in 1903
Zygaena
Moths of Europe